Endang can refer to

Dance
Endang and Indonesian and Malaysian dance expressing the religious message of Islam.

Other
Endang (name), an Indonesian unisex name (usually female).

Disambiguation pages